Thomas G. McGinn  is an American physician, Educator, and researcher in Evidence Based Medicine, Clinical Prediction Rules, clinical decision support. McGinn is the EVP of CommonSpirit Health and Professor of Medicine at Baylor College of Medicine

Biography 
McGinn graduated from State University of New York (Downstate) in 1989 and completed his residency in Internal Medicine at Albert Einstein College of Medicine/Bronx Municipal Hospital Center in the Bronx, New York in 1992. He continued at Bronx Municipal Hospital Center as Chief Resident from 1992 – 1993. He also received his MPH from Columbia University. 

In 2001 he was appointed Professor and Chief of the Division of General Internal Medicine at Icahn School of Medicine at Mount Sinai.

In 2011 McGinn moved to Northwell Health, where he was appointed Chair of the Department of Medicine. He created and directed the Center for Health Innovations and Outcomes Research (CHIOR)|url=http://medicine.hofstra.edu/department/medicine/medicine_chair_mcginn.html |title=Thomas McGinn, MD, MPH - Chair of Medicine - Hofstra North Shore-LIJ School of Medicine at Hofstra University |access-date=2014-12-04 |archive-date=2014-10-30 |archive-url=https://web.archive.org/web/20141030051401/http://medicine.hofstra.edu/department/medicine/medicine_chair_mcginn.html |url-status=dead }}</ref>

In 2021 he moved to CommonSpirit Health to become head of the Physician Enterprise at one the nations largest health Systems. McGinn has served as a Principal Investigator on a project funded by the NIH, Agency for Healthcare Research and Quality, aiming to develop a clinical prediction rule integration lab that will help ambulatory clinics bring evidence-based guidelines to the point of care. His work in evidence-based medicine (EBM) has derived and validated clinical prediction rules (CPR), and integrated these rules into electronic clinical decision support systems. He is the author of the clinical prediction rules chapter of the JAMA series Users' Guides to the Medical Literature, publishing articles with a focus on clinical prediction risk and decision-making in primary care.

Affiliations and positions 

McGinn was the Chief of the Division of General Internal Medicine at Mount Sinai Medical Center (2001 - 2011), the president of the Association of Chiefs and Leaders of General Internal Medicine (2010 - 2011), and Co-Chair of the Health Policy Committee of the National Society of General Internal Medicine (SGIM).

Awards and honors 
1989	SUNY Downstate Award: Outstanding Medical Student in Area of Public Health
1991	Leo M. Davidoff Society Teaching Award, Albert Einstein College of Medicine
1998	“Best Doctor,” New York Magazine
2000	Outstanding Teaching Award, Department of Medicine, Mount Sinai Medical Center
2000	“Best Doctor,” New York Magazine
2001	Fellow, New York Academy of Medicine
2002	Visiting Professor, Mahatma Gandhi Institute of Medical Sciences, Nagpur, India 
2003	Visiting Professor, Wake Forest University, Winston-Salem, North Carolina
2003	Endowed Professorship: Clifford L. Spingarn, M.D., Professorship in Primary Care Medicine, Mount Sinai School of Medicine
2004	Outstanding Alumni: Master Teacher Award in Preventive Medicine SUNY Downstate College of Medicine
2005	Top Ten Teachers Award, Department of Medicine, Mount Sinai Medical Center
2009	Fellow, Royal College of Physicians of Ireland

Selected books and publications 

McGinn T, McCullagh L, Kannry J, Knaus M, Sofianou A, Wisnivesky J, Mann D (2013). Efficacy of an evidence-based clinical decision support in primary care practices: A Randomized Clinical Trial. JAMA Intern Med. 2013 Sep 23;173(17):1584-91.

Jandorf L, Cooperman J, Stossel L, Itzkowitz S, Thompson H, Villagra C, Thélémaque L, McGinn T, Winkel G, Valdimarsdottir H, Shelton R, Redd W (2013). Implementation of culturally targeted patient navigation system for screening colonoscopy in a direct referral system. Health Educ Res. 2013 Feb 7.

Berger R, McGinn T (2013). Deciding whether to screen for abusive head trauma: do we need a clinical decision rule? Pediatr Crit Care Med. 2013 Feb;14(2):230-1.

Spyropoulos A, McGinn T, Khorana A (2012). The use of weighted and scored risk assessment models for venous thromboembolism. Thromb Haemost. 2012 Dec;108(6):1072-6.

McGinn T (2013). On being a physician...when you wish you weren't. J Gen Intern Med. 2013 Feb;28(2):328-9.

Li A, Kannry J, Kushniruk A, Chrimes D, McGinn T, Edonyabo D, Mann D (2012). Integrating usability testing and think-aloud protocol analysis with "near-live" clinical simulations in evaluating clinical decision support. Int J Med Inform. 2012 Nov;81(11):761-72.

Gazelle G, Kessler L, Lee D, McGinn T, Menzin J, Neumann P, van Amerongen D, White L; Working Group on Comparative Effectiveness Research for Imaging (2011). A framework for assessing the value of diagnostic imaging in the era of comparative effectiveness research. Radiology. 2011 Dec;261(3):692-8.

Mann D, Kannry J, Edonyabo D, Li A, Arciniega J, Stulman J, Romero L, Wisnivesky J, Adler R, McGinn_TG (2011). Rationale, design, and implementation protocol of an electronic health record integrated clinical prediction rule (iCPR) randomized trial in primary care. Implement Sci 2011 6(1):109.

Tang CY, Friedman JI, Carpenter DM, Novakovic V, Eaves E, Ng J, Wu YW, Gottlieb S, Wallenstein S, Moshier E, Parrella M, White L, Bowler S, McGinn TG, Flanagan L, Davis KL (2011). The effects of hypertension and body mass index on diffusion tensor imaging in schizophrenia. Schizophr Res 130(1-3):94-100.

Gardenier D, Wisnivesky J, McGinn LK, Kronish IM, McGinn TG (2011). Hepatitis C treatment completion in individuals with psychiatric comorbidity and depression. Gastroenterol Nurs 34(2):102-6.

Krauskopf K, McGinn TG, Federman AD, Halm EA, Leventhal H, McGinn LK, Gardenier D, Oster A, Kronish IM (2010). HIV and HCV health beliefs in an inner-city community. J Viral Hepat 2010 Oct 18.

Downes MJ, Roy A, McGinn TG, Wisnivesky JP (2010). Factors associated with furry pet ownership among patients with asthma. J Asthma 47(7):742-9.

Friedman JI, Wallenstein S, Moshier E, Parrella M, White L, Bowler S, Gottlieb S, Harvey PD, McGinn TG, Flanagan L, Davis KL (2010). The effects of hypertension and body mass index on cognition in schizophrenia. Am J Psychiatry 167(10):1232-9.

Bradley S, Karani R, McGinn T, Wisnivesky J (2010). Predictors of serious injury among hospitalized patients evaluated for falls. J Hosp Med 5(2):63-8.

References

Year of birth missing (living people)
Living people
Physicians from Illinois
American medical researchers
SUNY Downstate Medical Center alumni
Hofstra University faculty